The 2011 WNBA season is the 13th season for the Minnesota Lynx of the Women's National Basketball Association. The Lynx qualified for the WNBA Playoffs for the first time since 2004 and won their first Western Conference championship.

The Lynx finished the season with a 27-7 record, best in the WNBA and the best regular-season record in franchise history. They then defeated the San Antonio Silver Stars in three games and the Phoenix Mercury in two to reach the 2011 WNBA Finals.

The Lynx swept the Atlanta Dream to win their first WNBA championship.

Offseason

2011 WNBA Draft

The Lynx held the first overall pick in the 2011 Draft, and surprised nobody by selecting Maya Moore, a 6'0" forward out of Connecticut. Moore had won three consecutive Wade Trophies as the best player in women's college basketball, the only player to have done so. She had also won two championships with the Huskies. The Lynx also held the fourth overall pick, which they used to select Amber Harris from Xavier. Both Moore and Harris would ultimately make the team out of training camp.

In the second round, the Lynx selected Jessica Breland, Felicia Chester, and Kachine Alexander. The Lynx ultimately released Alexander.

Free Agency
The Lynx declined to re-sign Hamchetou Maiga-Ba and Kristen Mann. Instead, they signed veteran center Taj McWilliams-Franklin and center/forward Jessica Adair, who had played one game with the Lynx in the 2010 season.

Trades
The Lynx traded the draft rights to Jessica Breland to the New York Liberty for Angel Robinson and a second-round pick in the 2012 WNBA Draft. They traded Felicia Chester to the Atlanta Dream for Rachel Jarry and a second-round pick in the 2012 Draft. They traded Quanitra Hollingsworth to the Liberty for the rights to swap third-round picks in the 2012 draft, and they traded Nicky Anosike for a first-round pick in the 2012 Draft. The Lynx ultimately waived Jarry and Robinson.

Transaction log
February 1: The Lynx signed Jessica Adair.
February 18: The Lynx signed Taj McWilliams-Franklin.
April 9: The Lynx traded Nicky Anosike to the Washington Mystics in exchange for their first-round pick in the 2012 Draft.
April 11: The Lynx traded draft rights to Jessica Breland to the New York Liberty for the draft rights to Angel Robinson and New York’s second-round pick in the 2012 Draft.
April 11: The Lynx traded Felecia Chester to the Atlanta Dream for Rachel Jarry and a 2012 second-round draft pick.
May 12: The Lynx waived Hamchetou Maiga-Ba. 
May 27: The Lynx waived Angel Robinson and Kachine Alexander.
May 27: The Lynx traded Quanitra Hollingsworth to the New York Liberty in exchange for the right to swap third-round picks in the 2012 Draft.

Additions

Subtractions

Roster

Depth

Season standings

Schedule

Preseason

|- align="center" bgcolor="bbffbb"
| 1 || May 24 || 1:00pm || Indiana || 71–66 || Brunson (11) || Harris (10) || Wright (4) || Concordia University  2,055 || 1–0
|- align="center" bgcolor="bbffbb"
| 2 || May 31 || 7:00pm || @ Indiana || 76–70 || Whalen (12) || McWilliams-Franklin (8) || Wiggins (4) || Conseco Fieldhouse  3,817 || 2–0
|-

Regular season

|- align="center" bgcolor="ffbbbb"
| 1 || June 3 || 11:00pm || @ Los Angeles || NBATVPRIME || 74–82 || Moore (21) || Brunson (12) || Whalen (5) || Staples Center  13,589 || 0–1
|- align="center" bgcolor="bbffbb"
| 2 || June 5 || 3:30pm || Los Angeles || FS-NPRIME || 86–69 || Augustus (17) || Brunson (15) || Whalen (7) || Target Center  10,123 || 1–1
|- align="center" bgcolor="bbffbb"
| 3 || June 7 || 8:00pm || Tulsa ||  || 75–65 || Brunson (17) || Brunson (15) || Whalen (4) || Target Center  7,713 || 2–1
|- align="center" bgcolor="bbffbb"
| 4 || June 9 || 10:00pm || @ Seattle ||  || 81–74 || Brunson (22) || Brunson (14) || Whalen (10) || KeyArena  6,291 || 3–1
|- align="center" bgcolor="bbffbb"
| 5 || June 17 || 8:00pm || Atlanta ||  || 96–85 || Augustus (25) || Brunson (14) || Whalen (8) || Target Center  7,556 || 4–1 
|- align="center" bgcolor="bbffbb"
| 6 || June 19 || 3:00pm || @ Atlanta || SSO || 77–64 || Augustus (19) || McWilliams-Franklin (12) || MooreWhalen (5) || Philips Arena  7,274 || 5–1 
|- align="center" bgcolor="ffbbbb"
| 7 || June 24 || 10:00pm || @ Seattle || KONG || 55–65 || Augustus (17) || McWilliams-Franklin (8) || Whalen (3) || KeyArena  7,914 || 5–2 
|- align="center" bgcolor="ffbbbb"
| 8 || June 26 || 7:00pm || Indiana || NBATVFS-N || 75–78 || Moore (21) || Brunson (11) || Whalen (4) || Target Center  7,117 || 5–3 
|- align="center" bgcolor="bbffbb"
| 9 || June 30 || 8:00pm || @ Tulsa ||  || 101–73 || Whalen (21) || McWilliams-Franklin (9) || Whalen (5) || BOK Center  3,970 || 6–3 
|-

|- align="center" bgcolor="bbffbb"
| 10 || July 9 || 8:00pm || Connecticut || NBATVFS-N || 90–67 || Moore (26) || BrunsonMcWilliams-Franklin (10) || Whalen (8) || Target Center  8,205 || 7–3 
|- align="center" bgcolor="ffbbbb"
| 11 || July 13 || 1:00pm || Phoenix || NBATVFS-NFS-A || 105–112 || Augustus (22) || Brunson (16) || Whalen (6) || Target Center  11,820 || 7–4 
|- align="center" bgcolor="bbffbb"
| 12 || July 15 || 7:00pm || @ Indiana ||  || 80–70 || Brunson (20) || McWilliams-Franklin (9) || Whalen (7) || Conseco Fieldhouse  7,538 || 8–4 
|- align="center" bgcolor="bbffbb"
| 13 || July 16 || 8:00pm || Seattle ||  || 69–62 || Augustus (19) || Moore (9) || McWilliams-Franklin (4) || Target Center  7,733 || 9–4 
|- align="center" bgcolor="bbffbb"
| 14 || July 20 || 3:30pm || @ Phoenix || NBATVFS-A || 106–98 || Augustus (25) || AugustusBrunson (6) || Whalen (8) || US Airways Center  12,118 || 10–4 
|-
| colspan="11" align="center" valign="middle" | All-Star break
|- align="center" bgcolor="bbffbb"
| 15 || July 26 || 8:00pm || Los Angeles ||  || 85–72 || Augustus (22) || McWilliams-Franklin (9) || Whalen (7) || Target Center  8,044 || 11–4 
|- align="center" bgcolor="bbffbb"
| 16 || July 29 || 8:00pm || Seattle ||  || 92–67 || AugustusWiggins (16) || Augustus (5) || Moore (6) || Target Center  7,856 || 12–4 
|- align="center" bgcolor="bbffbb"
| 17 || July 31 || 3:00pm || @ San Antonio || NBATV || 70–69 || Whalen (23) || Brunson (13) || Whalen (6) || AT&T Center  7,260 || 13–4 
|-

|- align="center" bgcolor="bbffbb"
| 18 || August 2 || 8:00pm || Phoenix || ESPN2 || 90–73 || Moore (22) || McWilliams-Franklin (10) || Whalen (5) || Target Center  7,126 || 14–4 
|- align="center" bgcolor="bbffbb"
| 19 || August 4 || 8:00pm || San Antonio || NBATVFS-SW || 62–60 || McWilliams-Franklin (18) || Brunson (13) || Whalen (6) || Target Center  8,123 || 15–4 
|- align="center" bgcolor="bbffbb"
| 20 || August 7 || 8:30pm || @ Los Angeles || NBATV || 84–78 || Whalen (24) || AugustusBrunson (7) || Whalen (8) || Staples Center  13,528 || 16–4 
|- align="center" bgcolor="ffbbbb"
| 21 || August 9 || 10:00pm || @ Phoenix ||  || 80–85 || Moore (28) || Brunson (11) || Whalen (6) || US Airways Center  6,726 || 16–5
|- align="center" bgcolor="bbffbb"
| 22 || August 12 || 8:30pm || @ Chicago || CN100 || 79–76 || Whalen (16) || Brunson (11) || Whalen (6) || Allstate Arena  6,289 || 17–5 
|- align="center" bgcolor="bbffbb"
| 23 || August 14 || 7:00pm || Tulsa || NBATVFS-NCOX || 82–54 || Augustus (16) || Brunson (6) || Whalen (9) || Target Center  8,388 || 18–5 
|- align="center" bgcolor="ffbbbb"
| 24 || August 16 || 7:30pm || @ Connecticut || CSN-NE || 79–108 || Whalen (20) || BrunsonMoore (5) || McWilliams-Franklin (3) || Mohegan Sun Arena  9,323 || 18–6 
|- align="center" bgcolor="bbffbb"
| 25 || August 18 || 7:00pm || @ Washington ||  || 81–62 || Augustus (18) || McWilliams-Franklin (7) || Whalen (7) || Verizon Center  9,483 || 19–6 
|- align="center" bgcolor="bbffbb"
| 26 || August 20 || 8:00pm || Los Angeles ||  || 87–68 || Augustus (17) || McWilliams-Franklin (8) || Whalen (5) || Target Center  8,816 || 20–6 
|- align="center" bgcolor="bbffbb"
| 27 || August 23 || 8:00pm || @ Tulsa ||  || 78–72 || McWilliams-Franklin (18) || Brunson (10) || McWilliams-FranklinWhalen (4) || BOK Center  3,750 || 21–6 
|- align="center" bgcolor="bbffbb"
| 28 || August 26 || 8:00pm || San Antonio || NBATV || 85–75 || Augustus (19) || Brunson (8) || Whalen (9) || Target Center  9,212 || 22–6 
|- align="center" bgcolor="bbffbb"
| 29 || August 28 || 3:00pm || @ San Antonio ||  || 72–61 || Augustus (20) || Brunson (14) || 4 players (3) || AT&T Center  7,924 || 23–6 
|- align="center" bgcolor="bbffbb"
| 30 || August 30 || 8:00pm || Washington ||  || 73–56 || Whalen (21) || Brunson (7) || Whalen (5) || Target Center  8,065 || 24–6 
|-

|- align="center" bgcolor="ffbbbb"
| 31 || September 2 || 8:00pm || New York ||  || 62–78 || Augustus (17) || Brunson (8) || Augustus (6) || Target Center  8,929 || 24–7 
|- align="center" bgcolor="bbffbb"
| 32 || September 4 || 4:00pm || @ New York ||  || 86–68 || Moore (19) || BrunsonMcWilliams-FranklinMoore (6) || Whalen (7) || Prudential Center  8,247 || 25–7
|- align="center" bgcolor="bbffbb"
| 33 || September 8 || 8:00pm || Chicago || NBATVFS-NCN100 || 78–69 || Augustus (22) || MooreWhalen (7) || Whalen (10) || Target Center  8,781 || 26–7 
|- align="center" bgcolor="bbffbb"
| 34 || September 11 || 6:00pm || @ Phoenix || FS-A || 96–90 || AugustusMooreWright (15) || Adair (13) || Wright (6) || US Airways Center  12,666 || 27–7 
|-

| All games are viewable on WNBA LiveAccess or ESPN3.com

Postseason

|- align="center" bgcolor="bbffbb"
| 1 || September 16 || 9:00pm || San Antonio || NBATV || 66–65 || Whalen (20) || Brunson (14) || Whalen (5) || Target Center  11,891 || 1–0 
|- align="center" bgcolor="ffbbbb"
| 2 || September 18 || 5:00pm || @ San Antonio || ESPN2 || 75-84 || Augustus (24) || Brunson (16) || Whalen (3) || AT&T Center  7,023 || 1–1
|- align="center" bgcolor="bbffbb"
| 3 || September 20 || 8:00pm || San Antonio || ESPN2 || 85–67 || Augustus (22) || Brunson (9) || AugustusMcWilliams-FranklinMoore (4) || Target Center  8,734 || 2–1
|-

|- align="center" bgcolor="bbffbb"
| 1 || September 22 || 9:00pm || Phoenix || ESPN2 || 95–67 || Augustus (21) || Brunson (13) || Augustus (7) || Target Center  8,912 || 1–0
|- align="center" bgcolor="bbffbb"
| 2 || September 25 || 5:00pm || @ Phoenix || ESPN2 || 103–86 || McWilliams-FranklinMoore (21) || Brunson (9) || McWilliams-Franklin (7) || US Airways Center  8,617 || 2–0
|-

|- align="center" bgcolor="bbffbb"
| 1 || October 2 || 8:30pm || Atlanta || ESPN || 88–74 || Brunson (26) || Brunson (11) || Augustus (7) || Target Center  15,258 || 1–0
|- align="center" bgcolor="bbffbb"
| 2 || October 5 || 8:00pm || Atlanta || ESPN2 || 101–95 || Augustus (36) || Augustus (8) || Whalen (4) || Target Center  15,124  || 2–0
|- align="center" bgcolor="bbffbb"
| 3 || October 7 || 8:00pm || @ Atlanta || ESPN2 || 73–67 || Augustus (16) || Brunson (9) || AugustusMcWilliams-Franklin (4)|| Philips Arena  11,543 || 3–0
|-

Statistics

Regular season

Postseason

Awards and honors
Rebekkah Brunson was named WNBA Western Conference Player of the Week for the week of June 3, 2011.
Rebekkah Brunson was named WNBA Western Conference Player of the Week for the week of July 11, 2011.
Seimone Augustus was named WNBA Western Conference Player of the Week for the week of July 18, 2011.
Seimone Augustus was named WNBA Western Conference Player of the Week for the week of August 1, 2011.
Seimone Augustus was named WNBA Western Conference Player of the Week for the week of August 22, 2011.
Rebekkah Brunson was named WNBA Western Conference Player of the Month for the month of June.
Seimone Augustus was named WNBA Western Conference Player of the Month for the month of July.
Lindsay Whalen was named WNBA Western Conference Player of the Month for the month of August.
Maya Moore was named WNBA Rookie of the Month for the month of July.
Maya Moore was named WNBA Rookie of the Month for the month of August.
Seimone Augustus was named to the 2011 WNBA All-Star Team as a reserve.
Rebekkah Brunson was named to the 2011 WNBA All-Star Team as a reserve.
Maya Moore was named to the 2011 WNBA All-Star Team as a starter.
Lindsay Whalen was named to the 2011 WNBA All-Star Team as a reserve.
Lindsay Whalen finished as a Peak Performer, averaging 5.9 assists per game.
Rebekkah Brunson was named to the All-Defensive First Team.
Maya Moore was named Rookie of the Year.
Maya Moore was named to the All-Rookie Team.
Lindsay Whalen was named to the All-WNBA First Team.
Seimone Augustus was named to the All-WNBA Second Team.
Cheryl Reeve was named Coach of the Year.
Seimone Augustus was named Finals Most Valuable Player.

References

External links
Lynx look to keep ‘Special Season’ going as second half begins

Minnesota Lynx seasons
Minnesota
Women's National Basketball Association championship seasons
Western Conference (WNBA) championship seasons
Minnesota Lynx